Gandolgoryn Batsükh (born 15 May 1948) is a Mongolian judoka. He competed in the men's middleweight event at the 1976 Summer Olympics.

References

1948 births
Living people
Mongolian male judoka
Olympic judoka of Mongolia
Judoka at the 1976 Summer Olympics
Place of birth missing (living people)